Paul Philip Mullin (born 6 November 1994) is an English professional footballer who plays as a forward for National League side Wrexham. He is a product of the Everton, Liverpool and Huddersfield Town academies. He was the 2020–21 EFL League Two top scorer with Cambridge United and, having helped to secure their promotion to League One as runners-up, then subsequently moved to Wrexham ahead of the 2021–22 season where he again became top-scorer; this time in the National League. Born in England, he is eligible to play for Wales through his grandmother.

Career
Mullin was born in Litherland, Merseyside, a supporter of Everton. He spent time in the academies of both Everton and Liverpool and after a period in the Liverpool Foundation Football College, he moved to Huddersfield Town.

Huddersfield Town
Huddersfield Town's youth coach Frankie Bunn invited Mullin to the squad. Subsequently Mullin was signed to Huddersfield Town in 2012 after impressing at U18 and U21 level; he signed a one-year contract at the club. However, at the end of the 2013–14 season, Mullin was released by the club, without ever making a first team appearance.

Morecambe
After a successful trial period he signed for Morecambe on a short term contract in August 2014. He made his professional debut coming on as a second-half substitute in the League Cup first round defeat to Bradford City on 12 August 2014. Four days later, on his league debut, Mullin scored his first professional goal after coming on as a second-half substitute in the 3–2 win over Newport County, which he scored a winning goal. One week later, on 23 August, Mullin made his full debut scoring both goals in a 2–1 win away at Cambridge United. After scoring three goals in the first seven matches, Mullin signed a three-year contract with the club in mid-September. Then on 31 October 2014, Mullin would end his eleven games without scoring despite losing 2–1 to Accrington Stanley.

Swindon Town
On 27 June 2017, Mullin joined League two club Swindon Town for an undisclosed fee. Mullin was well regarded by fans for his hard-working approach but goals were hard to come by; which led to his departure after only one season.

Tranmere Rovers
In June 2018, he signed for Tranmere Rovers. He scored his first goal for Tranmere in a 4–3 EFL Trophy loss against Crewe Alexandra on 4 September 2018.

In January 2020, Tranmere Rovers took Premier League club Watford to an FA Cup third round replay after drawing 3–3 at Vicarage Road, Mullin scored a penalty in the first game and went on to score the winner after coming on as a substitute in the replay at Prenton Park. Tranmere drew Manchester United in the fourth round at home.

Cambridge United
Mullin signed for Cambridge United on a six-month loan deal on 31 January 2020, and scored his first goal for the club on 11 February 2020, away at Scunthorpe United. He scored again at Leyton Orient on 7 March, the last match before the season was curtailed due to the COVID-19 pandemic.

In July 2020, Mullin signed permanently on a one-year contract. On 20 October 2020, he scored a hat-trick in a 3–1 victory over Port Vale, taking his goal total to 11 in ten matches in all competitions. On 27 March 2021, Mullin scored his 25th league goal of the season in a 2–1 victory over Carlisle United, a goal which saw him break David Crown's record for the most league goals by a Cambridge United player in a season. As a gesture, club partners Mead renamed their stand the "Paul Mullin Stand", a name that would stay in place for the remainder of the 2020–21 season.

In April 2021, Mullin was nominated for the EFL League Two Player of the Season, before being announced as the winner at the EFL Awards on 29 April, where he was also named in the 2020–21 EFL League Two Team of the Season. Mullin was also awarded the League Two Golden boot after scoring 32 goals in Cambridge United's 2020–21 campaign, in which they secured promotion to the third tier of English football, a record number for the division since its rebranding in 2004.

Wrexham
At the end of the 2020–21 season Mullin rejected a new contract offer with Cambridge United and in July 2021 joined National League side Wrexham on a three-year deal. After scoring three goals across the course of the month, including a vital winner against FC Halifax Town, Mullin was awarded the league's Player of the Month award for November 2021. Mullin continued to have a successful first season at Wrexham, winning Wrexham Men's Team Top Goalscorer, Player of the Season, and Goal of the Season awards as well as the National League's Golden Boot and Player of the Season.

In October 2022, Mullin posted a picture of his boots on which was written a political message involving the Conservative Party. The club acted quickly to ban him from wearing the boots, calling the photo an "unwelcome distraction". Later that season, he wore another message on his boots, carrying a dedication to his son Albi who had recently been diagnosed with autism.

Career statistics

Honours
Tranmere Rovers
EFL League Two play-offs: 2019

Cambridge United
EFL League Two runners-up: 2020–21

Wrexham
FA Trophy: runner-up: 2021–22

Individual
EFL League Two Player of the Year: 2020–21
EFL League Two Top Scorer: 2020–21
EFL League Two Team of the Season: 2020–21
PFA Team of the Year: 2020–21 League Two
Cambridge United Player of the Season: 2020–21
National League Top Scorer: 2021–22
National League Player of the Season: 2021–22
Wrexham Player of the Season: 2021–22
Wrexham Goal of the Season: 2021–22

References

External links

1994 births
Living people
People from Litherland
Sportspeople from the Metropolitan Borough of Sefton
Welsh footballers
Association football forwards
Huddersfield Town A.F.C. players
Vauxhall Motors F.C. players
Morecambe F.C. players
Swindon Town F.C. players
Tranmere Rovers F.C. players
Cambridge United F.C. players
Wrexham A.F.C. players
National League (English football) players
English Football League players
Footballers from Liverpool